How to Murder a Rich Uncle is a 1957 British black comedy film directed by Nigel Patrick and starring Patrick, Wendy Hiller, Charles Coburn and Anthony Newley. It follows a man who plans to kill his wealthy Uncle George. It was based on the play Il faut tuer Julie by Didier Daix.

Cast
 Nigel Patrick – Henry
 Charles Coburn – Uncle George
 Wendy Hiller – Edith Clitterburn
 Katie Johnson – Alice
 Anthony Newley – Edward
 Athene Seyler – Grannie
 Kenneth Fortescue – Albert
 Paddy Webster – Constance
 Michael Caine – Gilrony
 Trevor Reid – Inspector Harris
 Cyril Luckham – Coroner
 Johnson Bayly – Radio Officer
 Martin Boddey – Police Sergeant
 Kevin Stoney – Bar Steward
 Anthony Shaw – Colonial
 Ian Wilson – Postman

Production
The film was known as Uncle George and The Death of Uncle George. It was written for the screen by John Paxton who had written A Prize of Gold for Warwick. Filming started 2 January 1957. It was Patrick's first film as director although he had directed for the stage.

References

External links
 
 

1957 films
1957 comedy films
CinemaScope films
Films directed by Nigel Patrick
British comedy films
Columbia Pictures films
1950s English-language films
1950s British films